Ezra 10 is the tenth and final chapter of the Book of Ezra in the Old Testament of the Christian Bible, or the tenth chapter of the book of Ezra-Nehemiah in the Hebrew Bible, which treats the book of Ezra and book of Nehemiah as one book. Jewish tradition states that Ezra is the author of Ezra-Nehemiah as well as the Book of Chronicles, but modern scholars generally accept that a compiler from the 5th century BCE (the so-called "Chronicler") is the final author of these books. The section comprising chapters 7 to 10 mainly describes the activities of Ezra the scribe and the priest. This chapter and the previous one deal with the problem of intermarriage, especially the solution of it, ending with a list of those who sent away their "foreign" wives and children; a somber note which finds relief in the Book of Nehemiah, as the continuation of the Book of Ezra.

Text

This chapter is divided into 44 verses. The original text of this chapter is in  Hebrew language.

Textual witnesses
Some early manuscripts containing the text of this chapter in Hebrew are of the Masoretic Text, which includes Codex Leningradensis (1008).

There is also a translation into Koine Greek known as the Septuagint, made in the last few centuries BCE. Extant ancient manuscripts of the Septuagint version include Codex Sinaiticus (S; BHK: S; 4th century), Codex Vaticanus (B; B; 4th century), and Codex Alexandrinus (A; A; 5th century).

An ancient Greek book called 1 Esdras containing some parts of 2 Chronicles, Ezra and Nehemiah is included in most editions of the Septuagint and is placed before the single book of Ezra–Nehemiah (which is titled in Greek). 1 Esdras 8:91-9:36 is an equivalent of Ezra 10 (Putting away of foreign wives and children).

The consensus (10:1–6)
Ezra's public humiliation and prayer attracted a group of people who joined him in 'demonstrations of sorrow over the sins of Israel', and as a result, they made a consensus of the resolution.

Verse 1
Now while Ezra was praying, and while he was confessing, weeping, and bowing down before the house of God, a very large assembly of men, women, and children gathered to him from Israel; for the people wept very bitterly.
The Hebrew shows that the people were assembling during Ezra's prayer. The Jerusalem Bible describes the prayer of Ezra as "also a sermon".

Verse 2
And Shechaniah the son of Jehiel, one of the sons of Elam, spoke up and said to Ezra, “We have trespassed against our God, and have taken pagan wives from the peoples of the land; yet now there is hope in Israel in spite of this.
The people acknowledged that they been unfaithful to God, in breach of the law. These passages contain prohibitions, very similar in character, directed against intermarriage with the nations that dwelt in Canaan, on the ground that such marriages would inevitably lead to idolatry and to the abominations connected with idolatrous worship.

Verse 5
Then Ezra arose, and made the leaders of the priests, the Levites, and all Israel swear an oath that they would do according to this word. So they swore an oath.
Although Ezra has been given Persian authority, his choice of action to make the leaders, priests, Levites, and all Israel "swear an oath" to abide by a covenantal agreement reflects "internal politics", in contrast to Nehemiah, who prefers 'to command and order'.

The assembly (10:7–15)
The whole community was assembled "in the street of the house of God"  to "confront the intermarriage issue and to decide on the divorce proposal".

The commission (10:16–17)
Following the majority opinion, Ezra appointed a commission by selecting 'men who were family heads' to form the official investigation of the intermarriage cases.

The guilty (10:18–44)
After the results of the commission's investigation were announced, an official list was created to record 'those found guilty of marrying pagan women.

See also
Jerusalem
Levites
Related Bible parts:Ezra 8, Ezra 9, Nehemiah 8

Notes

References

Sources

Further reading
Blenkinsopp, Joseph, "Ezra-Nehemiah: A Commentary" (Eerdmans, 1988)
Blenkinsopp, Joseph, "Judaism, the first phase" (Eerdmans, 2009)
Coggins, R.J., "The Books of Ezra and Nehemiah" (Cambridge University Press, 1976)
Ecker, Ronald L., "Ezra and Nehemiah", Ecker's Biblical Web Pages, 2007.
Grabbe, L.L., "Ezra-Nehemiah" (Routledge, 1998)
Pakkala, Juha, "Ezra the scribe: the development of Ezra 7–10 and Nehemiah 8" (Walter de Gryter, 2004)*Grabbe, L.L., "A history of the Jews and Judaism in the Second Temple Period, Volume 1" (T&T Clark, 2004)
Throntveit, Mark A. (1992) "Ezra-Nehemiah". John Knox Press

External links
 Jewish translations:
 Ezra - Chapter 10 (Judaica Press) translation [with Rashi's commentary] at Chabad.org
 Christian translations:
 Online Bible at GospelHall.org (ESV, KJV, Darby, American Standard Version, Bible in Basic English)
 Book of Ezra Chapter 10. Bible Gateway

10